This is a list of known governors of the Arabia Petraea. Created in AD 106 following its annexation by the Roman emperor Trajan, it was governed by a senatorial legate until 262, when Gallienus transferred the governorship to equestrian Praesides. It returned to Senatorial appointees with the sole rule of Constantine I after 324, which continued until the province was lost in the 630s.

Legati Augusti pro praetor Arabiae (106–262)
 Gaius Claudius Severus (107–116)
 Quintus Coredius Gallus Gargilius Antiquus (c. 118)
 Tiberius Julius Julianus Alexander (125)
 Lucius Aninius Sextius Florentinus (127)
 Titus Haterius Nepos (130)
 Lucius Aemilius Carus (141–142)
 Sextus Cocceius Severianus (145)
 Lucius Attidius Cornelianus (150–151)
 Gaius Allius Fuscianus (c. 160)
 Publius Julius Geminius Marcianus (162–163)
 Quintus Antistius Adventus (166–167)
 Lucius Claudius Modestus (between 167 and 169)
 [...] Severus (c. 177–c. 180)
 Quintus Flavius Julius Fronto (c. 181)
 Marcus Bassaeus Astur (between c. 188 and c. 195)
 Publius Aelius Severianus Maximus (193–194)
 Quintus Scribonius Tenax (between 194 and 196)
 Marcus Caecilius Fuscianus Crepereianus Floranus (before 198)
 Lucius Marius Perpetuus (200–c. 203)
 Quintus Aiacius Modestus Crescentianus (either between c. 198 and 200, or between 202 and 204)
 Aurelius Aurelianus (209–210)
 Quintus Scribonius Tenax
 Lucius Alfenus Avitianus (c. 212/215)
 Sextus Furnius Julianus (213–214)
 Quintus Flavius Balbus (between 213 and 220)
 Pica Caerianus (218)
 Gaius Furius Sabinus Aquila Timesitheus (vice praeses, acting in place of the legate, in 218 and again 222)
 Flavius Julianus (c. 219)
 Publius Plotius Romanus (between 211 and 222)
 Trebonius Fortunatus (c. 222)
 Caecilius Maximus (between 223 and 226)
 Claudius Sollemnius Pacatianus (between 223 and 230)
 Lucius Egnatius Victor Marinianus (? between 225 and 230)
 Pomponius Julianus (236)
 Decimus Simonius Proculus Julianus (c. 237/238)
 Marcus Domitius Valerianus (c. 238/239)
 Claudius Capitolinus (245–246)
 Caelius Felix (246–247)
 Marcus Aelius Aurelius Theo (between 253 and 259)
 Virius Lupus (before 259)
 [...]ius Gallonianus (259–260)
 Coc[...] Rufinus (? 261–262)
 Julianus (held post when two Augustii were ruling jointly)
 Erucius Clarus (uncertain date)
 Publius Pomponius Secundinus (uncertain date)
 Aelius (uncertain date)

Equestrian Praesides Arabiae (262–324)
 Junius Olympus (262–263)
 Statilius Ammianus (263–264)
 Julius Heraclitus (between 265 and 273)
 Aurelius Antiochus (between 265 and 273)
 Flavius Aelianus (274–275)
 Aurelius Petrus (278–279)
 Aemillius Aemillianus (282–283)
 Domitius Antonius (between 284 and 293)
 Marcus Aurelius Aelianus (between 293 and 305)
 Aurelius Asclepiades (between 293 and 305)
 Aurelius Felicianus (between 293 and 305)
 Aurelius Gorgonius (between 293 and 305)
 Aelius Flavianus (date uncertain)

Senatorial Praesides Arabiae (324–630)
 Flavius Antonius Hierocles (c. 343–344)
 Theodorus (346)
 Flavius Archelaus (c. 349–350)
 Andronicus (c. 356–357)
 Maximus (357–358)
 Belaeus (362–363)
 Ulpianus (364)
 Malchus (between 365 and 399)
 Flavius Bonus (392)
 Sabinianus (?– fourth or fifth century)
 Flavius Philocalus (?– fifth century)
 Flavius Arcadius Alexander (487)
 Hesychius (490)
 Flavius Elias (? – late fifth or early sixth century)

Sources

 
Arabia Petraea